Pyrausta bilineaterminalis is a moth in the family Crambidae. It was described by Koen V. N. Maes in 2009. It is found in South Africa.

References

Endemic moths of South Africa
Moths described in 2009
bilineaterminalis
Moths of Africa